Nove is a town and province in Veneto, Italy.

Nove, Noves, Nové, and Novés may also refer to:

People
 Alexander Nove (1915–1994), Russian professor
 Charles Nove (born 1960), BBC voiceover announcer
 Guy Novès (born 1954), former footballer and coach
 Laura de Noves (1310–1348), wife of Count Hugues de Sade and influenced poet Francesco Petrarch

Places
 Nove, Kirovohrad Oblast, Ukraine
 Noves, France
 Novés, Spain

Other
 Nove (TV channel), an Italian cable channel
 Nove Ware, a type of Italian earthenware
 Nove Nakajima, a fictional character in the TV series Magical Girl Lyrical Nanoha

See also
 
 
 
 
 9, "novo" in Portuguese
 New (disambiguation), "novo" in Czech, Slovak, and other languages
 Noveschi
 Nova (disambiguation)
 Novi (disambiguation)
 Novo (disambiguation)
 Novus (disambiguation)